Troy L. Waymaster is an American politician from the state of Kansas. A Republican, Waymaster is a member of the Kansas House of Representatives, representing the 109th district since 2013.

Waymaster graduated from Russell High School in Russell, Kansas, in 1996, and from the University of Kansas in 2000. He attended business school at Fort Hays State University, but did not complete his studies. He was elected to the Kansas House in the 2012 elections. On May 23, 2020, Waymaster ended his Congressional campaign and announced that he would seek reelection to the Kansas House of Representatives.

Waymaster and his wife, Crystal, have a son named Christian and live near Bunker Hill, Kansas.

References

External links

Living people
21st-century American politicians
Republican Party members of the Kansas House of Representatives
University of Kansas alumni
People from Russell, Kansas
Year of birth missing (living people)